María del Carmen Crespo Díaz is a Spanish politician, belonging to Partido Popular. She joined PP in 1990, and became Social Action Coordinator of the party in Andalusia. Since 1998 she is a deputy in the Andalusian parliament and since 2003 she is the mayor of Adra municipality, Almería province.

References

Mayors of places in Andalusia
Women mayors of places in Spain
Living people
20th-century Spanish politicians
20th-century Spanish women politicians
21st-century Spanish politicians
21st-century Spanish women politicians
Year of birth missing (living people)